Prebends Bridge, along with Framwellgate and Elvet bridges, is one of three stone-arch bridges in the centre of Durham, England, that cross the River Wear.

History

Prebends Bridge was designed by George Nicholson and built from 1772 to 1778. The bridge was built on the instructions of the Dean of Durham and served as a private road for the Dean and Chapter of Durham, giving access from the south through the Watergate.

It replaced a temporary bridge built after the footbridge, built in 1574, was swept away during a flood in 1771. The current bridge affords an excellent view of the cathedral and was built specifically with aesthetic considerations in mind - it was built slightly north of the prior bridge, at a wider part of the river, to improve the views available. Trees were planted along the riverbank to complete the Romantic picture.

Forming part of the estate of Durham Cathedral, the bridge is a Grade 1 listed building and is situated below the Watergate at the end of South Bailey (with which it is in concurrence), just after St Cuthbert's Society. Although the bridge is wide enough for vehicles, it is mainly used as a footbridge as it only leads to the Riverside paths and up to a closed road barrier to South Bailey. The bridge was restored from 1955 to 1956.

In autumn 2010 the bridge was temporarily reopened to road traffic under 3 tonnes while Saddler Street was closed because of extensive repaving works as part of the Heart of the City project, sponsored by Durham City Vision.

Plaque
Prebends Bridge has a plaque to display Sir Walter Scott's words about Durham:
Grey towers of Durham
Yet well I love thy mixed and massive piles
Half church of God, half castle ‘gainst the Scot
And long to roam these venerable aisles
With records stored of deeds long since forgot

References

External links 
Durham City Tourism

54.771, -1.5793

Bridges across the River Wear
Bridges completed in 1778
Bridges in County Durham
Buildings and structures in Durham, England
Grade I listed bridges
Durham, Prebends